The Manitoba Confederation of Regions Party ran several candidates in the 1986 provincial election, none of whom were elected.  Information about these candidates may be found on this page.

Al MacDonald (River East)

MacDonald worked in engineering technical support, and campaigned for the Confederation of Regions Party at the federal and provincial levels.

Footnotes

1986